Tecno Phantom X is an Android-based smartphone manufactured, released and marketed by Tecno Mobile as a standalone phantom sub-brand. The device was unveiled during an event held on 1 July 2021.

The Tecno Phantom X is an upgraded version of Tecno Phantom 9, coming with different features, including the OS, battery, camera, design, storage and memory. The phone has received generally favorable reviews, with critics mostly noting the battery, design, selfie camera and fast charging capacity. Critics, however, criticized the lack of stereo speakers.

Design 
The Phantom X has a design with a patterned glass back and Gorilla Glass 5 on the front, while the side frame is made of anodized aluminum. The device feature a vapor chamber cooling system attached to the chipset. For the front camera, the dual camera setup is embedded inside a dual punch-hole cut-out located at the left corner of the display.

Specifications

Hardware

Chipsets 
The device utilize the MediaTek Helio G95 system-on-chip.

Display 
The device features AMOLED display with 1080p support and a display size of 6.7-inches. It utilize an in-screen fingerprint sensor. The device has a curved edged display, super AMOLED panel and supports 90Hz refresh rate. It features 1080 × 2340 resolution with a 19.5:9 aspect ratio.

Storage 
The device offer 8 GB of RAM with 256 GB for internal storage.

Battery 
The device contain non-removable 4700 mAh Li-Po battery, supporting wired charging over USB-C at up to 33W.

Connectivity 
The phone support 4G LTE, Wi-Fi 802.11 and Bluetooth 5.0.

Cameras 

The phone's rear camera features a 50 MP wide sensor with laser autofocus, a 13 MP telephoto sensor with 2x optical zoom and an 8 MP ultrawide sensor. The front camera features a 48 MP wide sensor and 8 MP ultrawide sensor.

Supported video modes 
The Phantom X supports the following video modes:
 4K@30/60fps
 1080p@30fps

Software 
The device run on Android 11 based software overlay HiOS 7.6 at launch, and come bundled with a slew of apps like Peek Proof, Voice Changer, Phone cloner and Document correction among others.

Reception 
GSMArena awarded the phone 3.8 stars out of 5, noting that "Tecno is definitely trying to make a point with the Phantom X". Praise was directed towards the design, memory, selfie camera, battery and fast charging capacity. However, the lack of stereo speakers was criticized, while noting that "The display is good, but it lacks brightness".

Fisayo Fosudo praised the Phantom X for its design and fast charging capacity while noting that the device has "a gaming focused processor". He however criticized the device for the lack of stereo speakers, while noting that "the on-screen fingerprint reader and the face unlock method were kind of underwhelming".

George Kamau from Techweez gave a positive review of the Phantom X. Praise was directed towards the design, battery, performance and camera, while noting that "the Phantom X maxes out on its features and nails the fundamentals to deliver the best to consumers".

Dickson Otieno from Tech-ish praised the Phantom X for its under-display fingerprint scanner, battery and fast charging capacity. He opined further that "the processor will handle everything you throw at it quite well, however its 2021, and a 12nm process chip is old".

Duey Guison from Unbox noted that "the existence of the Phantom X is proof that TECNO has a lot of untapped potential as a brand that is rising globally".

References 

Android (operating system) devices
Phablets
Mobile phones introduced in 2021
Tecno smartphones